William McAulay (1 November 1879 – 1935) was a Scottish footballer who played as an inside left. He played for several league clubs in Scotland and England, with his longest spells at Aberdeen and Alloa Athletic.

Career
Born in Newton near Cambuslang in 1879, as a teenager McAulay played for local teams in the village and for Junior side Cambuslang Hibernian. He was signed by Celtic in April 1898 and scored in his single league appearance before being released by the Glasgow club in October of the same year in a cost-cutting measure.

McAulay was picked up by Sheffield Wednesday but only featured for their reserves and went back to Scotland on loan to Dundee. He then moved to Walsall Town Swifts, and in the three subsequent seasons turned out for Aston Villa, Portsmouth and Middlesbrough.

McAulay moved back to Scotland permanently when transferring to Aberdeen in 1903. He was the new club's first-ever league goalscorer after the merger leading to their formation. He spent three seasons at Pittodrie, averaging around a goal every three league games. In 1904 the Aberdeen Evening Gazette commented "He is, off the field, one of the most modest of men, and on it one of the trickiest players going. It is not too much to say that it is his experience and coaching that has made such a vast improvement on the team's forward play". He also spent time on loan at Arthurlie.

In 1906 McAulay moved to Falkirk for a year, at which time the Falkirk Herald said of him "He is extremely smart with his feet, and his dribbling tactics have astonished not a few opponents. He can shoot with accuracy, and seldom fails to gather a possible pass". He transferred to Hibernian in 1907  before spending the final years of his career at Alloa.

McAulay died in 1935.

References

Aston Villa F.C. players
Aberdeen F.C. players
Newton Thistle F.C. players
Falkirk F.C. players
Hibernian F.C. players
Arthurlie F.C. players
Walsall F.C. players
Sheffield Wednesday F.C. players
Middlesbrough F.C. players
Portsmouth F.C. players
Alloa Athletic F.C. players
Dundee F.C. players
Celtic F.C. players
Cambuslang Hibernian F.C. players
Scottish Junior Football Association players
1879 births
1935 deaths
Sportspeople from Cambuslang
Association football inside forwards
English Football League players
Scottish Football League players
Scottish footballers
Date of death missing
Southern Football League players
Footballers from South Lanarkshire